Mojmir Sepe (11 July 1930 – 24 December 2020), nicknamed Mojzes, was a Slovenian composer, conductor, arranger and trumpeter.

Career 
In 1949, he graduated from Celje First Grammar School (gymnasium) in Celje. Later he studied piano and trumpet at Ljubljana Academy of Music.

In 1950, he started his professional music career as a promising trumpet player at Radio Ljubljana Dance Orchestra. In 1956, Sepe married Slovenian singer Majda Sepe. He also established the jazz Mojmir Sepe Band, which published the first jazz vinyl record in Yugoslavia. His trumpet career ended after an altercation at Opatija Festival '65 when four guys knocked out a couple of his front teeth as he defended her from having her purse stolen. He committed to composing and conducting, mostly influenced by jazz and swing music.

He collaborated with several Slovenian poets who wrote lyrics for his arrangements. Among them were Frane Milčinski Ježek, Gregor Strniša, Branko Šomen, Miroslav Košuta, and Ivan Minatti.

Hit songs
1962 — "Zemlja pleše" by Marjana Deržaj
1964 — "Poletna noč" by Majda Sepe
1966 — "Brez besed" by Berta Ambrož
1969 — "Ljubi, ljubi, ljubi" by Eva Sršen
1970 — "Pridi, dala ti bom cvet" by Eva Sršen
1972 — "Med iskrenimi ljudmi" by Majda Sepe
1978 — "Ribič, ribič me je ujel" by Majda Sepe
1978 — Bojan the Bear (cartoon instrumental theme)

Brez besed vs. Eres tú plagiarism
Eres tú, the Spanish entry in the 1973 Eurovision Song Contest, has been accused of being a plagiarism of the Slovenian song "Brez besed" performed by Berta Ambrož and representing Yugoslavia at the 1966 Eurovision Song Contest. Brez Besed was written by composer Mojmir Sepe and lyricist Elza Budau, both Slovenians. However, Sepe and Budau never officially complained or filed a lawsuit against Eres Tú composer Juan Carlos Calderón, and therefore nothing further happened.

Eurovision 
Sepe represented Yugoslavia two times as composer.

Sepe conducted both his compositions in the Eurovision Song Contest. Additionally, he was the conductor for the Slovenian entries in 1997 and 1998. He was also the Slovenian jury member in the 1993 Eurovision pre-selection.

Personal life
Sepe was married to Majda Sepe, a famous Slovenian singer, for whom he also wrote music. He died on Christmas Eve 2020, at the age of 90. In 1957, the daughter , who later proclaimed herself as a film director, was born to them.

References

External links
Slovenian Composers Society dss.si
 

1930 births
2020 deaths
20th-century classical composers
20th-century conductors (music)
20th-century jazz composers
20th-century male musicians
21st-century classical composers
21st-century conductors (music)
21st-century jazz composers
21st-century male musicians
Male classical composers
Male conductors (music)
Male jazz composers
Slovenian classical composers
Slovenian male musicians
Slovenian conductors (music)
Slovenian jazz composers
Slovenian music arrangers
Eurovision Song Contest conductors
People from the Municipality of Črna na Koroškem